Autognetidae is a family of mites belonging to the order Sarcoptiformes.

Genera:
 Austrogneta Balogh & Csiszár, 1963
 Autogneta Hull, 1916
 Conchogneta Grandjean, 1963
 Cosmogneta Grandjean, 1960
 Eremobodes Jacot, 1937
 Parautogneta Golosova, 1974
 Raphigneta Grandjean, 1960
 Rhaphigneta Grandjean, 1960
 Triautogneta Fujikawa, 2009

References

Sarcoptiformes